Planters Nut & Chocolate Company is an American snack food company now owned by Hormel Foods. Planters is best known for its processed nuts and for the Mr. Peanut icon that symbolizes them. Mr. Peanut was created by grade schooler Antonio Gentile for a 1916 contest to design the company's brand icon.  The design was modified by a commercial artist and has continued to change over the years.

History

Planters was founded by Italian immigrant Amedeo Obici in Wilkes-Barre, Pennsylvania. He started his career as a bellhop and fruit stand vendor in Scranton, Pennsylvania. Obici later moved to Wilkes-Barre, opened his own fruit stand, and invested in a peanut roaster. Obici turned peddler within a few years, using a horse and wagon, and calling himself "The Peanut Specialist". In 1906, Obici entered a partnership with Mario Peruzzi, the soon to be owner of Planters. Peruzzi had developed his own method of blanching whole roasted peanuts, doing away with the troublesome hulls and skins; and so with six employees, two large roasters, and crude machinery, Planters was founded. Amedeo Obici believed that prices and first profits were as important as repeat business, focusing his operation on quality and brand name for continued success. Two years later, the firm was incorporated as Planters Nut and Chocolate Company.  By 1913, Obici had moved to Suffolk, Virginia, the peanut capital of the world, and opened the company's first mass production plant and facility there. In 1950, the company created a puzzle called "PLANTERSPEANUTSPUZZLE" and offered prizes for that.   It was acquired by Standard Brands in 1960. In 1981, Standard Brands merged with Nabisco Brands, which was acquired by Kraft Foods in 2000. Kraft subsequently merged with the H.J. Heinz Company to form Kraft Heinz in 2015.

On January 22, 2020, Planters released a teaser for its Super Bowl LIV commercial featuring Mr. Peanut with Wesley Snipes and Matt Walsh. The trio were shown hanging onto a branch after accidentally driving the Nutmobile off a cliff, with Mr. Peanut electing to let go and fall to his presumed death, and the Nutmobile on the ground suddenly exploding. The company's social media outlets declared Mr. Peanut to have died, although a company spokesperson told Advertising Age that they had not ruled out the scenario being a comic book death. However, Planters pulled the ad and the marketing for it five days later after the death of Kobe Bryant.
Planters suspended the campaign on January 26, shortly after the 2020 Calabasas helicopter crash which resulted in the death of everyone onboard, including former NBA player Kobe Bryant. They eventually resumed the campaign with the Super Bowl commercial, which showed Snipes and Walsh presiding over the funeral of Mr. Peanut, also attended by fellow mascots Kool-Aid Man and Mr. Clean. However, Kool-Aid Man's tears combined with sunlight cause a new, younger incarnation of Mr. Peanut, dubbed "Baby Nut", to grow from the soil.

Since the premiere of the commercial, the Planters Twitter account has been used to make posts in-character as Baby Nut. It also retweeted posts from several Baby Nut meme accounts created before the ad aired, prompting Twitter to suspend them under the presumption that they were created by the company's agency to manipulate the platform in violation of its terms of use. 

The campaign faced a mixed reaction from viewers, while comparisons were drawn between the character and other juvenile incarnations of characters seen in media, such as "Baby Yoda" of The Mandalorian, and Groot.

Explaining the intent of the campaign, a spokesman for Planters's advertising agency cited the examples of superhero deaths in the Marvel Cinematic Universe for how such a death could connect with viewers and potential customers.

In August 2020, a continuation of the campaign launched, where Baby Nut is revealed to have aged into a 21 year-old young adult, "Peanut Jr." This decision resulted in much more volatile reactions than Baby Nut's campaign, with a tweet encouraging others to block Peanut Jr.'s account becoming viral.

In February 2021, Kraft Heinz announced it will sell Planters and its other nuts businesses to Hormel for $3.35 billion. The transaction was completed on June 7.

Slogans

Advertising taglines have included:

 "The Nickel Lunch!" – peanuts/peanut bars (1930s–1940s)
 "Planters is the word for (good) Peanuts." (Various products – 1950s)
 "America is Nuts for Planters" (1970s)
 "Everybody Loves a Nut!" (1990s)
 "Peanut butter with a crunch." (P.B. Crisps – 1992)
 "Relax. Go Nuts." (Deluxe Mixed Nuts – 1997)
 "Put Out the Good Stuff." (Various products – 2003)
 "Instinctively Good." (Various products – 2007)
 "Naturally Remarkable." (Various products – 2011)
 "Deliciously NUT-RITIOUS." (UK range – 2016)
 "Harness the Power of the Peanut"
 "A Nut Above"
 "Become One With the Nut"
 "It's Nuts How Good They Are"
 "The Power is in the Peanut"

Products

 Cheez Balls (discontinued and reintroduced in 2018)
 Cheez Curls (discontinued and reintroduced in 2018) 
 Cocktail Peanuts
 Cooking oil
 CornNuts (acquired in late 1990s)
 Chocolate Covered Cashews
 Dry Roasted Peanuts
 Dry Roasted Sunflower kernels
 Honey Roasted Peanuts
 Honey Roasted Cashews
 Hot Peanuts
 Mixed Nuts
 NUT-rition Heart Healthy Mix
 Salted Cashews
 Salted Peanuts
 Salted Redskin Spanish Peanuts
 Tavern Nuts (discontinued and reintroduced in 2009)
 Smoked Almonds
 Peanut Butter
 Potato Chips
 Salted Caramel Peanuts
 Cocoa Peanuts
 Chipotle Peanuts
 Chili and Lime Peanuts
 Sea Salt and Vinegar
 Heat Peanuts
 Smoked Peanuts
 Sweet N' Crunchy Peanuts
 Nut Clusters
 Sweet N' Spicy

Discontinued

 Jumbo Block Peanut Candy (presumably discontinued)
 Coconut Balls
 Corn Chips
 P.B. Crackers
 P.B. Crisps (introduced in 1992)
 Peanut Butter Chocolates
 Peanut Bar
 Peanut Butter candies
 Peanut Butter Fudge Cookies
 Onion Peanuts
 Garlic Peanuts
 Dry Roasted Cashews
 Dry Roasted Peanuts (original version)

International
While used under license from Kraft Canada, Planters in Canada is made by JVF Canada.  Some Planters items do not use the Planters name, but are sold under the Kraft brand name in Canada.  As of 2015, Planters Peanut Butter and Kraft Peanut Butter are both available.

As of 2016, Planters has launched into the United Kingdom with a range of 14 products under the tagline "Deliciously NUT-RITIOUS". Planters in the UK is made by Trigon Snacks Trading Ltd. at their factory in Aintree in Liverpool.

Vegan concerns
Some Planters nut products such as their larger-sized jars of peanuts contain gelatin, making them unsuitable for vegans.

References

External links

 

1906 establishments in Pennsylvania
American companies established in 1906
Food and drink companies established in 1906
Products introduced in 1906
Companies based in Luzerne County, Pennsylvania
Hormel Foods brands 
Peanut dishes
American brands
Snack food manufacturers of Pennsylvania
Wilkes-Barre, Pennsylvania
2021 mergers and acquisitions